{| 

{{Infobox ship career
| Hide header=
|Ship country=United Kingdom
|Ship flag=
| Ship name = Duchess of Buccleuch
| Ship namesake = Duchess of Buccleuch 
| Ship owner =
| Ship operator = 
| Ship ordered = 
| Ship builder = James Edwards, South Shields<ref name=Tyne>[http://www.tynebuiltships.co.uk/D-Ships/duchessofbaccleugh1843.html Tyne Built Ships: '"Duchess of Buccleuch.]</ref>
| Ship original cost = 
| Ship laid down = 
| Ship launched = 1843
| Ship acquired = 
| Ship commissioned = 
| Ship decommissioned = 
| Ship in service = 
| Ship out of service = 
| Ship renamed = 
| Ship captured = 
| Ship fate = Wrecked 1850
| Ship notes = 
}}

|}Duchess of Buccleuch was launched in 1843 at South Shields as an East Indiaman. She was wrecked in 1850.

CareerDutchess of Buccleugh first appeared in Lloyd's Register (LR) in 1843 with Straker, master, J.Edwards, owner, and trade Shields–Calcutta.

On 18 May 1849 Duchess of Buccleuch grounded on the Long Sand in the North Sea off the coast of Essex. Her crew were rescued.   Two days later she was gotten off after some of her cargo had been unloaded and her mainmast cut away. A steamer towed her into Ramsgate. Duchess of Buccleuch had almost 10 feet of water in her hold. On 24 August she sailed from Shields for Calcutta.

On 19 February 1850 Duchess of Buccleuch ran aground and was damaged in the Hooghly River. She was on a voyage from Liverpool to Calcutta. She was refloated and taken in to Calcutta.

FateDuchess of Buccleugh'' ran ashore on 7 June 1850 at Quion Point near Cape Agulhas after losing her rudder. Her crew were rescued. She was on a voyage from Calcutta to London. She was carrying a cargo of indigo, rice, pepper, and silk. On 26 July she was refloated and taken to Cape Town where she was condemned.

Citations

1843 ships
Ships built on the River Tyne
Age of Sail merchant ships of England
Maritime incidents in May 1849
Maritime incidents in February 1850
Maritime incidents in June 1850